Rafiqul Islam Chowdhury (died 14 October 2008) was a Bangladesh academic and political scientist. He served as the 9th vice-chancellor of the University of Chittagong.

References

2008 deaths
Academic staff of the University of Chittagong
Vice-Chancellors of the University of Chittagong